The November 2020 Afghanistan attacks were multiple attacks launched by insurgents including the Taliban and Islamic State of Iraq and the Levant – Khorasan Province in November 2020. The attacks left at least 88 people dead and more than 193 injured.

Timeline of the attacks

See also
 2020 in Afghanistan
 List of Islamist terrorist attacks
 List of mass car bombings
 List of terrorist attacks in Kabul
 List of terrorist incidents in 2020
 List of terrorist incidents linked to ISIL
 May 2020 Afghanistan attacks
 June 2020 Afghanistan attacks
 July 2020 Afghanistan attacks
 August 2020 Afghanistan attacks
 September 2020 Afghanistan attacks
 October 2020 Afghanistan attacks

References

2020 in Kabul
2020 mass shootings in Asia
November attacks
2020s crimes in Kabul
November 2020 attacks
21st century in Badakhshan Province
21st century in Faryab Province
21st century in Ghazni Province
21st century in Helmand Province
21st century in Herat Province
21st century in Kunduz Province
21st century in Maidan Wardak Province
November 2020 attacks
Crime in Ghazni Province
Crime in Helmand Province
Crime in Herat Province
Crime in Kunduz Province
History of Baghlan Province
Improvised explosive device bombings in 2020
November 2020 attacks
ISIL terrorist incidents in Afghanistan
Mass murder in 2020
Mass murder in Kabul
Mass shootings in Kabul
November 2020 crimes in Asia
Taliban attacks